The Nigeria A' national football team is the local national football team of Nigeria and is open only to indigenous domestic league players. The team represents Nigeria at the WAFU Nations Cup and the African Nations Championship and is controlled by the Nigeria Football Federation. They are also known as the CHAN Eagles.

The CHAN Eagles came third at the 2014 African Nations Championship, at the 2018 edition hosted in Morocco, Nigeria reached the final but lost 4–0 to the hosts.

They have also appeared at the WAFU Nations Cup 4 times, hosting the tournament twice and winning the 2010 edition.

African Nations Championship record

WAFU Nations Cup record

Results

Squad
The following players were called up for the 2020 African Nations Championship qualification and 2019 WAFU Cup of Nations matches against Togo and Cape Verde.

Caps and goals as of 19 October 2019 after the match against Togo.

Previous squads

African Nations Championship squads
 CHAN 2014 squad
 CHAN 2016 squad
 CHAN 2018 squad

Honours

African Nations Championship:
 Second place: 2018
 Third place: 2014
WAFU Nations Cup
 Champions: 2010

References

External links

A
Nigeria